Cryphiops caementarius is a South American freshwater shrimp.

Distribution
The males are called . The females return to the estuaries to spawn, and the larvae migrate up-river.

Description

Capture and culture
It is caught for food from the wild. There has been experimental aquaculture of this species.
In Chile, the aquaculture production technology has been developed by the research staff of the Aquaculture Department of the Universidad Católica del Norte, trying to enhance cultivation at commercial level, obtaining a sustainable production in order to decrease the pressure on natural populations. By collecting of ovigerous females from their natural habitat, research shows that it is possible to cultivate C. caementarius juveniles in 65 days through 18 zoeal stages.

References

Palaemonidae
Edible crustaceans
Freshwater crustaceans of South America
Crustaceans described in 1782